Sugitaniella is a genus of moths belonging to the subfamily Thyatirinae of the Drepanidae. It contains only one species, Sugitaniella kuramana, which is found in Japan (Honshu).

References

Moths described in 1933
Thyatirinae
Monotypic moth genera
Moths of Japan
Drepanidae genera